Cornelius Bryan (1775 - 18 March 1840) was an English organist and composer.

Background

He was born in Bristol around 1775.

He died on 18 March 1840 when he fell through a trap in the stage of the Bristol theatre, during a rehearsal of his opera “Lundy”.

Appointments

Organist at St. Mark’s Church, Bristol
Organist at St Mary Redcliffe, Bristol 1818 - 1840

Compositions

He composed 
an opera Lundy.
 Effusion in F for organ

References

1775 births
1840 deaths
English organists
British male organists
English composers